The Birth of Cornelius is a 2007 studio album by Corneille released in 2007. It was an English language album in contrast to earlier Corneille albums in French language. It reached #23 in the French Albums Chart staying for 14 weeks in the chart. The album received a generally mixed reception from fans and critics.

Track list (2007)
The original album was released by Wagram Music and included the following songs
"Back to Life" (4:32)
"Love Is Good" (3:24)
"Too Much of Everything" (3:43)
"I Never Loved You" (3:53)
"Murder" (4:04)
"Spending On You" (3:58)
"Sweet Dependency" (4:36)
"Home Is By You" (5:41)
"I'll Never Call You Home Again" (3:47)
"A Man of This World" (4:26)
"The One" (4:30)
"Heaven" (5:15)

Track list (2009)
In 2009, Universal Music released the album under the same title, including some new materials and omission of some tracks found on the original Wagram release

"Back to Life" (4:34)
"All of My Love" (3:03)
"Liberation" (3:35)
"A Man of This World" (4:32)
"Murder" (4:09)
"Foolish Heart" (5:27)
"Too Much of Everything" (3:48)
"Home Is By You" (5:43)
"I'll Never Call You Home Again" (3:48)
"Sweet Dependency" (4:38)
"Heaven" (5:13)

References

2007 albums
Corneille (singer) albums